Andreas Wildhagen (born 31 July 1988 in Oslo, Norway) is a Norwegian jazz drummer.

Biography 
Wildhagen was raised in Oslo and attended the Norwegian Academy of Music in 2012, and earned his Master's degree in 2014. He has become a much sought after jazz drummer and participates on a series of records with bands like Paal Nilssen-Love Large Unit, Nakama, Lana Trio, Momentum, Jonas Cambien Trio, and Mopti. In 2016 he released his debut solo album No Right No Left on Nakama Records.

Discography

Solo albums 
 2016: No Right No Left (Nakama Records)

Collaborations 
With Mopti
2013: Logic (Ocean Sound Recordings)
2016: Bits & Pieces (Jazzland Recordings), featuring Bendik Baksaas

With Lana Trio
2013: Lana Trio (Va Fongool)
2014: Live In Japan (Va Fongool)

With Paal Nilssen-Love Large Unit
2014: First Blow (PNL Records)
2014: Erta Ale (PNL Records)
2015: Rio Fun (PNL Records)
2015: 2015 (PNL Records)
2016: Ana (PNL Records)

With Nakama
2015: Before The Storm (Nakama Records)
2016: Grand Line (Nakama Records)
2016:Most Intimate (Nakama Records)
2017:Worst Generation (Nakama Records)

With Momentum
2016: Momentum (Clean Feed)

With Jonas Cambien Trio
2016: A Zoology Of The Future (Clean Feed)

References

External links 
Website on Nakama Records

1988 births
Living people
Norwegian Academy of Music alumni
Norwegian jazz composers
21st-century Norwegian drummers
Norwegian jazz drummers
Male drummers
Musicians from Oslo
Male jazz composers
21st-century Norwegian male musicians
Mopti (band) members
Nakama (band) members